Turricula granobalteus is a species of sea snail, a marine gastropod mollusk in the family Clavatulidae.

Description
The size of an adult shell varies between 25 mm and 40 mm.

The elongate-fusiform, turreted shell is rather thin. It contains ten whorls. The sutures are channeled. The colour of the shell is pale buff, with rust dots between the peripheral nodules, and irregular rust streaks and splashes elsewhere.

Sculpture: On the summit of each whorl is a collar of two strong spirals. Besides, the whole surface is over-ran with fine, close, flat-topped spiral threads, amounting to about fifty-five on the body whorl. Along the shoulder runs a row of upright tubercles, twice as high as broad, and more than their own breadth apart—twenty-two on the penultimate whorl, most distinct on the earlier whorls, and gradually fading till they almost disappear on the body whorl. From these evanescent tubercles faint radials descend to the base. The trough of the deeply excavate fasciole is crossed by fine crescentic radial threads.

Aperture :—The outer ip is thin, its edge not reflected, without internal lyrae. The sinus is wide and shallow. The siphonal canal is straight and produced.

Distribution
This marine species occurs off Australia (Northern Territory, Queensland, Western Australia) and off Japan

References

 Powell, A.W.B. 1968. The Turrid shellfish of Australian waters. Australian Natural History 1 16: 1–6
 Wilson, B. 1994. Australian Marine Shells. Prosobranch Gastropods. Kallaroo, WA : Odyssey Publishing Vol. 2 370 pp.
 Tucker, J.K. 2004. Catalog of recent and fossil turrids (Mollusca: Gastropoda). Zootaxa 682: 1–1295 
 Taylor, J.D. & Glover, E.A. (2004) Diversity and distribution of subtidal benthic molluscs from the Dampier Archipelago, Western Australia; results of the 1999 dredge survey (DA2/99). Records of the Western Australia Museum Supplement, 66, 247–291. NIZT 6

External links
 
 Indo-Pacific Mollusca; Academy of Natural Sciences of Philadelphia. Delaware Museum of Natural History v. 2 no. 9-10 (1968–1969)

granobalteus
Gastropods described in 1922